Bird City Township is a township in Cheyenne County, Kansas, USA.  As of the 2000 census, its population was 771.

Geography
According to the USGS, it contains three cemeteries: Bird City, Community and Evergreen.

Cole Pond (historical) and Leach Pond are within this township.

Transportation
Bird City Township contains five airports or landing strips: Bird City Airport, Bursch Airport, Gillilands Farm Airport, Stout Landing Strip and Wilkens Airport.

References
 USGS Geographic Names Information System (GNIS)

External links
 US-Counties.com
 City-Data.com

Townships in Cheyenne County, Kansas
Townships in Kansas